Land of Mine is a 2015 historical war drama film directed by Martin Zandvliet. It was shown in the Platform section of the 2015 Toronto International Film Festival. It was selected and nominated for the Best Foreign Language Film category at the 89th Academy Awards.

The film is inspired by real events and tells a story of German prisoners of war ordered to clear land mines in Denmark after World War II. It is estimated that more than 2,000 soldiers including a number of teenagers, under the command of German officers, removed mines. 169 of them lost their lives during the five months of mine clearing, 165 were severely wounded and 167 lightly wounded. The removal was part of a controversial agreement between the German Commander General Georg Lindemann, the Danish Government and the British Armed Forces, under which German soldiers with experience in defusing mines would be in charge of clearing the mine fields.

Plot 
Following the end of World War II in Europe and the liberation of Denmark from German occupation in May 1945, the Wehrmacht occupiers became prisoners of war. Returning to the Danish Army after service in the British Parachute Regiment, sergeant Carl Leopold Rasmussen furiously beats up a German prisoner for carrying a Danish flag. A group of young German prisoners are handed over to Rasmussen's commanding officer Captain Ebbe Jensen and sent to the west coast, where they are trained to use their bare hands to remove the mines that the Germans had buried in the sand.  They are warned not to expect any sympathy from the Danes, who resent their former occupiers. Rasmussen shares this contempt and is determined to treat the young prisoners without sympathy.

Rasmussen is rude to and contemptuous of them and the neighbouring farm treats them with hostility. After marching his squad onto the dunes, he promises that they will return home in three months, if they can each defuse six mines per hour for a total of 45,000 mines. Rasmussen's hostility begins to recede slightly and the boys' leader Sebastian Schumann attempts to remain optimistic as they discuss their plans for when they return home. The POWs are not given food due to post-war shortages and begin to suffer from malnourishment, with Ernst befriending a young local girl to steal some bread from her. The optimistic Wilhelm's arms are blown off and he dies in a field hospital. Most of the boys are poisoned by rat faeces in grain that they find on a nearby farm; they are treated by Rasmussen who makes them purge themselves with seawater.

Rasmussen begins to treat his charges more kindly, stealing food from the base for them and tries to maintain morale by reporting that Wilhelm has survived. He also allows the boys to use a device invented by Sebastian to improve productivity. Hearing rumours of Rasmussen stealing food for the boys, Ebbe brings a group of British soldiers to abuse and torment the boys. Rasmussen stops them but is confronted about the theft by Ebbe, who accuses him of being sympathetic towards the Germans. Werner is blown to bits after encountering landmines buried one above another and his twin brother Ernst goes to search for him and continues to deny his death even after being comforted by Rasmussen.

After a casual game of football, Rasmussen's dog is blown up in a supposedly cleared zone of the beach. This causes Rasmussen to snap and begin abusing the boys again. He forces them to march close together across the cleared zones of the beach to confirm that they are safe. When a young local girl walks out into an uncleared area of beach, her mother comes looking for Rasmussen only to find him gone. The boys volunteer to help save the girl. Ernst walks through the uncleared minefield to keep the little girl calm whilst Sebastian clears a path to safety for her. They manage to rescue her but instead of returning to safety with Sebastian, Ernst decides he cannot go on without his twin brother and commits suicide by walking backwards into the uncleared section and dies promptly.

After witnessing this act of kindness and bravery from the boys, Rasmussen relents in his treatment of them and reassures a grieving Sebastian that they will soon be able to go home. While four of the boys continue to clear the beach with Rasmussen, the rest of them are loading unexploded mines onto a truck. When one of the boys tosses a mine that was not properly defused onto the truckbed of deactivated mines, he accidentally sets off a massive chain reaction and kills himself and his comrades standing nearby. Only Sebastian, Ludwig, Helmut and Rodolf remain.

Although the boys had been promised that they would be sent home after defusing all of the mines, without Rasmussen's knowledge Jensen decides to send the surviving four to join a team defusing landmines without the aid of a map in another coastal area. He informs Rasmussen, who argues in vain for Jensen to rescind the order. Rasmussen decides to go against orders and rescues them, driving them within 500 metres of the German border and they obey his order to run to their freedom.

Cast

Production 
Filming began in July 2014 and ended in August 2014. The film was shot at historically authentic locations, including in Oksbøllejren and areas in Varde. The use of the historical beaches led to the discovery of a real live mine during the production.

Reception

Critical response 
Review aggregator Rotten Tomatoes gives the film a 92% "Certified Fresh" rating, with an average score of 7.44/10, based on reviews from 107 critics. The website's critical consensus states: "Land of Mine uses an oft-forgotten chapter from the aftermath of World War II to tell a hard-hitting story whose period setting belies its timeless observations about bloodshed and forgiveness." On Metacritic, the film has a weighted average score of 75 out of 100, based on 26 critics, indicating "generally favorable reviews".

The film gained a standing ovation at the Toronto International Film Festival, with Stephen Farber of The Hollywood Reporter stating "Director Martin Zandvliet has come up with a fresh and compelling approach to this well-traveled territory" and David D'Arcy of the Screendaily stating "Land of Mine achieves moments of chilling suspense in scenes of untrained soldiers defusing mines by hand and in the bloody bodies that leap into the air when the boys fail". Domestically it received 5 out of 6 stars from a number of critics, who all stated it was the best Danish film of the year. It was selected to play at Sundance in 2016.

Accolades 
Land of Mine has also won numerous awards, including Best Actor, Best Supporting Actor and Best Danish Film at the Bodil Awards.

See also 
 List of submissions to the 89th Academy Awards for Best Foreign Language Film
 List of Danish submissions for the Academy Award for Best Foreign Language Film
 Ten Seconds to Hell

References

External links 
 
 

2015 drama films
2015 films
2015 war drama films
Best Danish Film Bodil Award winners
Best Danish Film Robert Award winners
Danish war drama films
2010s Danish-language films
Films set in 1945
German prison films
German war drama films
2010s German-language films
World War II films based on actual events
World War II prisoner of war films
Danish World War II films
German World War II films
2015 multilingual films
Danish multilingual films
German multilingual films
2010s German films